Găvan River may refer to:

 Găvan, a tributary of the Olt in Brașov County
 Găvan River (Siret)

See also 
 Gavan (disambiguation)